Aapo was a 1994 Finnish film directed by Tero Jartti and based on a short story by Runar Schildt. The screenplay was written by Jari Hietanen. The film was set in the year 1918. Taisto Reimaluoto portrayed Aapo.

Cast
Taisto Reimaluoto ....  Aapo 
Esko Salminen ....  Kertoja (voice) 
Ulla Koivuranta ....  Lempi 
Kai Lehtinen ....  Volanen 
Martti Suosalo ....  Räsänen 
Esko Nikkari ....  Maanviljelysneuvos 
Merja Larivaara ....  Maanviljelysneuvoksetar 
Jouni Salo ....  Puutarhuri 
Paavo Liski ....  Pehtori 
Juha Lampinen ....  Magnus 
Johanna Piiroinen ....  Magnuksen sisko 
Linda Haakana ....  Magnuksen sisko
Martti Jantunen .... Valkkalan renki

External links
 

1990s Finnish-language films
1994 films
1994 drama films
Finnish drama films